West Shreve Run is a  long tributary to Lake Canadohta (Oil Creek) in Crawford County, Pennsylvania.  The watershed is about 50% forested and 43% agricultural.  The rest is of other uses.

Course
West Shreve Run rises on the South Branch French Creek divide about 1 mile south of Hinckley Corners, Pennsylvania.  West Shreve Run then flows south through the Erie Drift Plain to Oil Creek (Lake Canadohta).

Watershed
West Shreve Run drains  of area, receives about 46.4 in/year of precipitation, has a topographic wetness index of 461.04 and is about 50% forested.

References

Additional Images

Rivers of Pennsylvania
Rivers of Crawford County, Pennsylvania
Rivers of Erie County, Pennsylvania